Branislav Stanić (born 30 July 1988) is a Serbian professional footballer who plays as a midfielder.

Career
After coming through the youth system of Partizan, Stanić signed his first professional contract with the club in July 2007, on a five-year deal. He made one league appearance for Partizan in the title-winning 2007–08 season.

In early 2014, Stanić moved to Kyrgyzstan League side Dordoi Bishkek, winning one trophy with the club, the Kyrgyzstan Super Cup, on 24 March 2014.

Honours
Dordoi Bishkek
 Kyrgyzstan Super Cup: 2014

References

External links
 
 
 

Association football midfielders
Expatriate footballers in Kyrgyzstan
Expatriate footballers in Slovakia
FC Dordoi Bishkek players
FC ViOn Zlaté Moravce players
FK Hajduk Kula players
FK Kolubara players
FK Novi Pazar players
FK Partizan players
FK Rad players
FK Sloboda Užice players
FK Smederevo players
FK Teleoptik players
People from Brus
Serbian expatriate footballers
Serbian expatriate sportspeople in Slovakia
Serbian First League players
Serbian footballers
Serbian SuperLiga players
Slovak Super Liga players
1988 births
Living people